Down by Law may refer to:
 Down by Law (band), an American punk rock band
 Down by Law (Down by Law album), their 1991 debut album
 Down by Law (film), a 1986 film by Jim Jarmusch
 Down by Law (Deadline album), 1985
 Down by Law (MC Shan album), 1987